Dundumwezi is a modified word from its original "Dundumwenze" which means a male mountain. It is a constituency of Chief Siachitema's area in the south-west of Kalomo District of Southern Province in Zambia. It is an underdeveloped remote constituency that lacks infrastructure and basic necessities and is often ignored by the government. It lacks roads hospitals, schools and housing.

Demographics 

Dundumwezi is inhabited by the Tonga people of Zambia.

References 

Populated places in Southern Province, Zambia